The common dentex (Dentex dentex) is a species of fish in the family Sparidae.

Etymology 
Genus and species Latin name Dentex is related to dentēs which means "teeth".

Description 
The body is oval and compressed. Teeth are very developed in each jaw. Dentex have 11 dorsal spines: 11–12 dorsal soft rays; 3 anal spines: 7–9 anal soft rays. Adults are grey-blue, while young dentex have a slightly different livery, brown-blue with blue fins.

Biology 
Dentex is an active predator, feeding on other fish, mollusca and cephalopods. It is solitary for most of the year, but during reproduction it lives in groups for some weeks: fully-grown dentex stay together just two to three weeks during spring in the warmer water near the surface.

Distribution and habitat 
Dentex is common in the Mediterranean Sea (called sinarit in Turkish), but also seen in the Black Sea and the Eastern Atlantic Ocean from the British Isles to Mauritania, sometimes up to Senegal and Canary Islands.

References

Further reading

External links
 

Sparidae
Fish described in 1758
Taxa named by Carl Linnaeus